Peterbell is an unincorporated place and dispersed rural community in geographic Coderre Township, in the Unorganized North part of Algoma District in northeastern Ontario, Canada. It is on the Canadian National Railway transcontinental railway main line between the railway points of Argolis to the west and Dunrankin to the east, has a passing track, and is passed but not served by Via Rail transcontinental Canadian trains. The place is on the Missinaibi River, a tributary of the Moose River. It is named for Peter Bell, who was in charge of the Hudson's Bay Company Superior District from 1866 to 1895.

History
Peterbell is part of a section of what was originally the Canadian Northern Railway that was under construction from 1912 to 1913.

References

Other map sources:

Communities in Algoma District